Duffy is a surname of Irish origin that comes from the original Irish name Ó Dubhthaigh, meaning descendant of Dubthach. Dubthach was an Old Irish first name meaning "black".

Variations include: Duffey, Duffee, Duff, Duthie, O'Duffey, O'Duffy, Duffe, O'Duffe, Dufficy, Doey, Dohey, Doohey, Duhig, Dowey and O'Dowey. The name originates from Connacht.

It may refer to:

Irish
Charles Gavan Duffy, Irish nationalist poet, later Australian colonial politician
Chris Duffy, several people
David Duffy (banker) (born 1960/61), Irish banker
Eamon Duffy, historian
Francis Noel Duffy, Irish Green Party politician, TD for Dublin South-West since 2020
Gabriel Duffy, Irish writer
George Gavan Duffy, Irish politician
James Duffy (Irish publisher), an Irish publisher of Nationalist and Roman Catholic books, bibles and religious texts
James Duffy (VC), Irish recipient of the Victoria Cross in 1917
Jim Duffy (journalist), author, political commentator, and Irish advisor to Australia's Republic Advisory Committee
Joe Duffy, Irish radio personality
Joseph Duffy (bishop), Irish Catholic bishop
Keith Duffy, Irish musician from Boyzone
Luke Duffy, trade unionist and politician 
Mark Duffy (banker), Irish banker
Martin Duffy (filmmaker), Irish filmmaker and writer
Mik Duffy, Irish filmmaker and journalist on film
Shane Duffy, Irish footballer
Thomas Duffy (VC) (1805–1858), Irish recipient of the Victoria Cross in 1857

Australian
Bill Duffy (1866–1959), sportsman
Charles Gavan Duffy (1816–1903), Irish nationalist poet, later Australian colonial politician
Frank Gavan Duffy (1852–1936), judge
Kevin Duffy (footballer) (1897–1977) Australian footballer
Max Duffy (born 1993), player of Australian and American football

New Zealand
Ron Duffy, New Zealand rugby league footballer

Scottish
Amanda Duffy (died 1992), Scottish murder victim
Carol Ann Duffy, Poet Laureate of the United Kingdom
Darryl Duffy, Scottish football player
Jim Duffy (footballer), former football (soccer) player and manager
Neil Duffy Sr., Scottish footballer
Neil Duffy Jr., Scottish-South African footballer (son of above)

Welsh
Aimee Anne Duffy, real name of Welsh singer Duffy (singer)
Richard Duffy, Welsh footballer

English
Adam Duffy, English professional snooker player
Billy Duffy, British musician
Brian Duffy (photographer), British photographer
Brian Duffy, real name of British drummer Jet Black of The Stranglers
Christopher Duffy, British historian
John Duffy and David Mulcahy, British murderers
Martin Duffy, keyboardist with Primal Scream
Maureen Duffy, British writer
Nick Duffy, British songwriter
Patrick Duffy (British politician)
Paul Duffy, bass guitarist for The Coral
Peter Duffy, British Barrister
Philip Duffy, English composer of sacred music
Stephen Duffy, British songwriter

North American
Barbara Duffy (born 1959), American dancer
Brian Duffy (astronaut), American astronaut
Bruce Duffy, Irish-American novelist, author of The World as I Found It
Charles John Duffy, American WWII pilot, namesake of USS Duffy
Chris Duffy (baseball), American baseball player
Danny Duffy, American baseball player
Francis P. Duffy, Canadian-American Catholic priest
Gerald Duffy, American screenwriter
Hugh Duffy, American baseball player
J. C. Duffy, American cartoon artist
James E. Duffy Jr., United States Democratic Party nominee for the Hawaii Supreme Court
Jimmy Duffy, Irish-Canadian distance runner
Jim Duffy (baseball coach) (born 1974), American college baseball coach
Jo Duffy, American comics book writer
John Duffy (soccer), U.S. soccer player at 1928 Summer Olympics
John A. Duffy, American Roman Catholic bishop
Julia Duffy, American actress
Karen Duffy, American model and actress
Kevin Duffy (1933–2010), American judge
Matt Duffy, American baseball player
Megan Duffy (born 1984), American basketball player and coach
Megan Duffy (actress) (born 1979), American actress and producer
Meghan Duffy, American biologist
Mike Duffy, Canadian senator, retired television journalist
Pat Duffy, American skateboarder
Patricia Lynne Duffy, synesthete
Patrick Duffy (born 1949), American television actor
Robert Duffy (politician), American mayor
Roger Duffy, American architect
Romney Duffey, American/Canadian scientist
F. Ryan Duffy, American politician
Sean Duffy, a politician from Wisconsin
Thomas C. Duffy, composer, conductor, Yale University professor
Thomas J. Duffy, American craftsman/designer
Troy Duffy, American actor and film director
Uriah Duffy, bass player in Whitesnake and many other bands

Multiple entries
James Duffy (disambiguation)
Martin Duffy (disambiguation)
Michael Duffy (disambiguation)
William Duffy (disambiguation)

Duffey
A. D. Duffey, California legislator
Arthur Duffey, American athlete
Doug Duffey, American blues musician
Eliza Bisbee Duffey, American feminist
George Frederick Duffey, President of the Royal College of Physicians of Ireland
Ike Duffey, American businessman and sports executive
Jett Duffey, American football quarterback
Jim Duffey, Virginia Secretary of Technology, 2010–2014
Joe Duffey, rugby union 
John Duffey (soldier), American soldier who fought in the American Civil War
John Duffey, American bluegrass musician
Joseph Duffey, American academic administrator
Mike Duffey, Ohio politician
Romney Duffey, American nuclear scientist
Thomas J. Duffey, member of the Wisconsin State Assembly
Todd Duffey, American actor
Tyler Duffey, American baseball player
Warren J. Duffey, U.S. Representative from Ohio
William S. Duffey Jr., United States District Judge

See also
Duff (surname)

English-language surnames
Anglicised Irish-language surnames
Surnames of Irish origin